Joseph Tripician, also known as Joe Tripician and Joe Trip, is an American producer, writer, screenwriter, film director, songwriter, playwright and performer. He is best known for the documentaries Borders and Metaphoria and his memoir Balkanized at Sunrise, based on Tripician's journey to the Balkans in 1997.

Early life and education

Joseph Tripician was born in Atlantic City, New Jersey, to Nicoli and Dolores Tripician. He has two brothers, Bill and Carl. Tripician studied at the American University and has a MFA (Master of Fine Arts) from Columbia University.

1970s – Absolute Mania and Jim Henson
In 1970, while still in high school, Tripician formed a comedy group called Absolute Mania with Bob "Duggan" Hill and Morgan "Skip" Thomas. The group hosted a cable TV humor program in South Jersey entitled Absolute Mania that ended abruptly after a sketch about the renowned American musician Johnny Cash's alleged drug use caused controversy. In 1978, Tripician interviewed John Draper, aka " Captain Crunch," the "phone freak" and pioneer computer hacker.  The original video of that interview is now part of the collection at the Computer History Museum in Mountain View, California.  Between 1978 and 1979, Tripician also was employed by Henson Associates as a production assistant, where he worked closely with Jim Henson, the famous creator of The Muppets.

1980s – Music videos, borders and other documentaries
In 1980, Tripician worked as editor of the documentary Memories of Duke, directed by Gary Keys and based on the biography of the famous American composer, pianist, and bandleader of a jazz orchestra Duke Ellington.  At the same time, he wrote and directed the short film Shrapnel Training Course, a parody infomercial satirizing the CIA. Later, Tripician produced and co-directed several musical videos included in a compilation called Danspak, which was distributed by Sony Video Software and released, in three parts (1982, 1984 and 1986). Some of the videos included were "Hip Hop, Be Bop (Don't Stop)," by Man Parrish, "Pointy Head Gear," by Shöx Lumania, "Jimmy, Gimme Your Love," by Michael Musto & The Must, and "Alien Girl," by Richard Bone, in 1982; "I've Got A Right," by The Lenny Kaye Connection, and "Sweet Jane," a cover of The Velvet Underground's song performed by The Jim Carroll Band, in 1984 (that video featured a cameo appearance of the late American songwriter Lou Reed); "Grace," by The Ordinaires, "Skintight Tina," by Prince Charles Alexander, and "Buttercup," by Stevie Wonder performed by Carl Anderson, both released in 1985. In 1984, Tripician and his partner Merrill Aldighieri were listed in the Rolling Stone Book of Rock Video as one of the twenty top video directors in the world. In 1988, Tripician produced, edited and co-directed with Merrill Aldighieri, The Kissing Booth, a documentary starring Quentin Crisp, among others. In 1989, he wrote, produced, edited and co-directed, again with Merrill Aldighieri, the mixed genre television movie Borders, starring Steve Buscemi and Robert Anton Wilson, and directed The Gun is Loaded, a short film written and performed by Lydia Lunch.

1990s – Metaphoria, Aliens and Ozark Melody with Jeff Buckley
In 1991, Tripician wrote, produced, edited and co-directed with Merrill Aldighieri the video documentary Metaphoria, which was awarded an Emmy Award for Best Documentary of Cultural Significance (1992).   The same year, Metaphoria won awards at the Chicago International Film Festival, the Montreal International Film Festival, the Sinking Creek Film Festival, and the Cyber Arts Festival in Los Angeles.

In 1992, Tripician also edited several segments of the television news show The Wall Street Journal Report. In 1993, Tripician produced, edited and co-directed with Aldighieri the short film Motel Blue 19, adapted from the play by Edgar Oliver, and worked as co-director of graphics and animation of the Oscar-nominated documentary The War Room, directed by Chris Hegedus and D. A. Pennebaker. In 1994, Tripician was nominated for the Intercultural Film/Video Fellowship in Media Arts by the Rockefeller Foundation. The following year, Tripician was the on-line editor of the awarded video documentary The Conspiracy of Silence, directed by Neal Marshad and Donna Olson. In 1997, Tripician's paperback book The Official Alien Abductee's Handbook was published by Andrews and McMeel. That book was the inspiration for Melodies for Abductees, a pop-music album which included the novelty song "Ozark Melody," composed by Tripician, Frederick Reed and American songwriter Jeff Buckley, who also sang and performed guitar and mandolin on it. Tripician also co-directed with Jakov Sedlar the feature documentary Tudjman, narrated by the American actor Martin Sheen and based on the biography of the Croatian president, Franjo Tudjman. Later that year, Tripician traveled to the Balkans, after being hired by the Croatian government to write Tudjman's official biography. The working title of that book was In Tito's Shadow. After granting Tripician editorial control of the book and receiving the complete manuscript, the content caused a controversy within the Tudjman government, and the book was summarily banned. In May 2002, Joe performed his one-man play Balkanized at Sunrise at Dixon Place Theater in New York City. The play was based on his 1997 trip to the Balkans. Joe subsequently published his story in a memoir of the same name.

In 1998, Joe co-founded the company iStreamTV in New York City, which provided streaming video services to a number of corporate clients. Tripician worked in that company to 2001.

Tripician's films and videos were exhibited in various galleries and museums, such as The Guggenheim Museum, The Whitney Museum of American Art, and The New Museum of Contemporary Art, in New York; The Laforet Museum, in Tokyo, Japan; and The Museum of Modern Art, in Paris, France.

2000s – From Balkanized at Sunrise to Team Joy
In 2002, Tripician wrote and performed a one-man show called Balkanized at Sunrise at the Dixon Place Theater in New York City, directed by Gigi van Deckter. Balkanized at Sunrise is also the title of his memoir published on Amazon in 2010, with a second edition published in 2016. Also in 2002, New Riders Press published a book about Macromedia entitled Flash MX Magic and written by Matthew David, Glenn Thomas, Joe Tripician, et al.

From 2007 to late 2008, Tripician worked as the Director of Broadband Services at Medialink Worldwide, the public communications firm whose clients included companies such as Philips, Johnson & Johnson, Bank of America, General Motors, and Nokia.
 
In 2007, Tripician wrote, edited and directed the short video The Student, which premiered at the Big Apple Film Festival. In 2009, he wrote, edited and directed Kitchen Sink Stories, a three-part web series. In 2012, the e-books My Night with Sarah Palin and Other Disturbing Stories (a collection of short stories) and Immortality Wars (a science fiction detective novel dealing with nanotechnology and the concept of singularity proposed by Ray Kurzweil) were published. In 2013, the e-book Joe Tripician – Obras Seleccionadas: Volumen 1 (Joe Tripician – Selected Works: Volume 1), was published. It included Spanish translations of short stories and song lyrics written by Tripician, who collaborated on the book. Argentine teacher, researcher, writer and musician Pablo Martin Aguero made the translations. That year, Tripician wrote, produced, edited and directed A Pizza Chegou (also known as Pizza Run), a short film filmed in São Paulo, Brazil. He also began development on Moto Anjos, an action crime feature film, starring Brazilian actor Vinicius de Oliveira.

In June 2016 Truth Entertainment, the producers of the Oscar-winning film Dallas Buyers Club, announced that they would produce a new film written and to be directed by Tripician titled Team Joy.  Production is scheduled to begin in early 2018.

Personal life
In March 1999, Tripician married Cecilia Tripician. They live in São José dos Campos, São Paulo, Brazil, with their daughters Helena and Olivia.

Influences
According to Tripician, he is influenced by writers such as Terry Southern, Elmore Leonard, Edgar Allan Poe, J.G. Ballard, Robert Anton Wilson and Philip K. Dick; and films such as Stanley Kubrick's Dr. Strangelove or How I Stopped Worrying and Loved the Bomb, Luis Buñuel's Belle de Jour and Orson Welles' The Third Man.

Awards and nomination

Filmography

Discography

Books

 2016: Chats from Beyond: Stories to Amuse, Frighten and Disturb. Publisher: Amazon Digital Services LLC.
 2016: Balkanized at Sunrise: A Memoir of A Reluctant Propagandist.
 2013: Obras Seleccionadas: Volumen 1 (Joe Tripician – Selected Works: Volume 1).
 2012: My Night with Sarah Palin and Other Disturbing Stories.
 2012: Immortality Wars. Publisher: Smashwords Editions.
  1997: The Official Alien Abductee's Handbook.

References

1953 births
Living people
Film producers from New Jersey
American male writers
Writers from Atlantic City, New Jersey
Columbia University School of the Arts alumni
American University alumni